Laketon may refer to the following places:
United States
 Laketon, Indiana
 Laketon Township, Michigan
 Laketon Township, South Dakota
Canada
 Laketon, British Columbia
Laketon, New Brunswick

See also
 Laketown (disambiguation)
 Lake Town (disambiguation)